Amegilla mucorea, is a species of bee belonging to the family Apidae subfamily Apinae.

References

External links
 http://animaldiversity.org/accounts/Amegilla_mucorea/classification/

Apinae
Insects described in 1845